Frederick Franklin Moon (July 3, 1880 – September 3, 1929) was a forester, and head of the New York State College of Forestry at Syracuse University from 1920-27.

Early life and education 

Moon born in Easton, Pennsylvania, on July 3, 1880, to William White and Ophelia Frances Nightingale Moon. He attended Amherst College (B.A., 1901), spent two years conducting postgraduate work at Harvard University (1902 to 1904), before attending  Yale University (M.F., 1909).

Career 
After graduation Moon worked for governmental forestry organizations for several years, including a year in Kentucky working for the United States Forest Service followed by approximately a year and a half working for New York State in the Hudson forest reservation.

From 1912-20, Moon was Professor of Forest Engineering at the New York State College of Forestry at Syracuse University. In 1920 Moon became a Professor of Silviculture. He served as Acting Dean of the College from 1917 to 1918 while Dean Hugh P. Baker was in the Army. In 1920 Moon was named Dean of the College after Baker resigned.

He was a member of the American Forestry Association, the Society of American Foresters, the American Association for the Advancement of Science, and was the delegate for the World Congress of Forestry in 1926.

End of life 
Moon died on September 3, 1929. Moon is buried in Oakwood Cemetery - adjacent to the SUNY College of Environmental Science and Forestry campus. His headstone overlooks the campus.

Key works 
Moon wrote several books, including Elements of Forestry, and The Book of Forestry.

Legacy 
In 1933 the library for the SUNY College of Environmental Science and Forestry was moved to Marshall Hall on the SUNY ESF campus and it was renamed the Moon Memorial Library. In 1968 the library moved to a new location.

See also 
 History of the New York State College of Forestry

References

External links

 Elements of Forestry at Google Books

1880 births
1929 deaths
People from Easton, Pennsylvania
History of forestry education
Amherst College alumni
Yale School of Forestry & Environmental Studies alumni
State University of New York College of Environmental Science and Forestry faculty
Leaders of the State University of New York College of Environmental Science and Forestry
New York State College of Forestry
Burials at Oakwood Cemetery (Syracuse, New York)
20th-century American academics